Macamic Lake is a freshwater body of the municipalities of Macamic, Authier-Nord and Chazel in the Regional County Municipality (MRC) of Abitibi-Ouest, in the administrative region of Abitibi-Témiscamingue, in Quebec, in Canada.

Lake Macamic is surrounded by a mainly agricultural area. The surface of this body of water is generally frozen from mid-November to the end of April; however, the period of safe ice traffic is usually from mid-December to the end of March.

The arrival of the Transcontinental Railway to Macamic in 1916 (passing south of Macamic Lake) and La Sarre, Quebec in 1917 contributed greatly to the colonization of this area. Pioneers of lots awarded in the area usually arrived by train from the Mauricie or the Capitale-Nationale region. For example, the pioneers were getting off the train at Macamic, south of Macamic Lake, with their livestock, settlements and provisions. Then, they used boats to cross Macamic Lake and take the La Sarre River to their respective lot in the area of Chazel. These pioneers were generally supplied by the train by their extended family who lived in Mauricie.

Geography 

Lake Macamic is supplied with water by:
East side (Bellefeuille Bay): Macamic River, Little Bellefeuille River, Royal-Roussillon Creek;
East side (Perron Bay): a small unnamed river;
South side: Lois River which flows to the village of Macamic.

On the north side of the lake, the lakes "De Courval" and "Piton" are surrounded by marsh areas that drain into the La Sarre River. The mouth of Lake Macamic is located at the bottom of a bay on the north side. Its outfall is the La Sarre River which runs 3.3 km to the northwest,  to the west, then  to the south to flow into the La Sarre Bay, of Abitibi Lake.

Toponymy
The geographer Hormisdas Magnan attests that the name "Macamic" is of Algonquin origin meaning "amazing ". Other historians attribute to it rather the meaning of "lame beaver" to this name; the component "mak" means "disabled" and "amik" is associated with "beaver". The graph "Makamik" has long been in use.

The toponym "Macamic Lake" was formalized on December 5, 1968, at the Bank of Place Names of the Commission de toponymie du Québec.

Notes and references

See also 

Macamic, a municipality
Authier-Nord, a municipality
Chazel, Quebec, a municipality
La Sarre River, a watercourse
Loïs River, a watercourse
Macamic River, a watercourse
Bellefeuille River (Macamic Lake), a watercourse
Abitibi-Ouest, a Regional County Municipality (RCM)

Lakes of Abitibi-Témiscamingue